Simionescu is a Romanian-language surname. Notable people with the surname include:

Adrian Simionescu
Grigore Simionescu, Romanian general
Ion Th. Simionescu
Mariana Simionescu, Romanian tennis player
Nicolae Simionescu
Vlăduț Simionescu

See also
 Simionești (disambiguation)

Romanian-language surnames